Robert Barrable (born 1 September 1987) is an Irish rally driver. He is racing in the WRC-2 since the 2013 season. He has also raced in the Intercontinental Rally Challenge and the European Rally Championship.

Career results

WRC results

WRC 2 results

IRC results

ERC results

Complete British GT Championship results
(key) (Races in bold indicate pole position) (Races in italics indicate fastest lap)

External links

ewrc-results.com

Living people
1987 births
Irish rally drivers
Intercontinental Rally Challenge drivers
World Rally Championship drivers
European Rally Championship drivers